The United States Military Entrance Processing Command (USMEPCOM) is a Major Command of the U.S. Department of Defense, which  primarily screens and processes enlisted personnel applicants into the United States Armed Forces.  

USMEPCOM does not process commissioned officer candidates entering the U.S. armed forces through the five U.S. service academies or college and university ROTC programs.  

College/university graduate candidates for the services' various officer candidate schools and USAF officer training school accession programs will initially process via a station of USMEPCOM if they have no prior active or inactive military service or if they have not been previously medically qualified while on a military contract through another commissioning program such as that prior to the final two years of college/university level ROTC. 

USMEPCOM is headquartered in North Chicago, Illinois and operates 65 Military Entrance Processing Stations (MEPS) located throughout the United States. The command's motto is Freedom's Front Door, signifying that a service member's military career starts when they walk through the doors of the MEPS.

USMEPCOM is a joint service command under the direction of the Deputy Assistant Secretary of Defense for Military Personnel Policy, who in turn reports to the Under Secretary of Defense for Personnel and Readiness.

These stations process applicants for military service, putting them through a battery of tests and examinations to ensure that they meet the standards required to serve in the United States Armed Forces. These tests include vision, hearing, blood, and blood pressure tests, a pregnancy test (for women), an examination by a doctor, a height and weight check, urinalysis, a breathalyzer test, a moral/background examination, as well as the Armed Services Vocational Aptitude Battery (ASVAB). If applicants are deemed qualified for military service, they will also meet with a service counselor, negotiate and sign enlistment contracts, and swear or affirm an entrance oath.

USMEPCOM has been awarded the Joint Meritorious Unit Award three times. The first award was for the period of 1 July 1982 until 30 April 1985; the second award was for the period of 1 January 2005 until 31 December 2007; and the third award was for the period of 16 April 2016 until 24 May 2019.

List of processing stations (MEPS)

Eastern Sector

Albany, New York
Atlanta, Georgia (Fort Gillem)
Baltimore, Maryland (Fort Meade)
Beckley, West Virginia
Boston, Massachusetts
Buffalo, New York (Niagara Falls Air Reserve Base)
Charlotte, North Carolina
Chicago, Illinois
Cleveland, Ohio
Columbus, Ohio
Detroit, Michigan now in Troy, Michigan
Fort Dix, New Jersey
Fort Jackson, South Carolina
Fort Lee, Virginia
Harrisburg, Pennsylvania (Ronald Reagan Federal Building and Courthouse)
Indianapolis, Indiana
Jackson, Mississippi
Jacksonville, Florida
Knoxville, Tennessee
Lansing, Michigan
Louisville, Kentucky
Memphis, Tennessee
Miami, Florida
Milwaukee, Wisconsin
Montgomery, Alabama (Maxwell Air Force Base)
Nashville, Tennessee
New York City
Pittsburgh, Pennsylvania (William S. Moorehead Federal Building)
Portland, Maine
Raleigh, North Carolina
San Juan, Puerto Rico
Springfield, Massachusetts (Westover Air Force Reserve Base)
Syracuse, New York
Tampa, Florida

Western Sector

Albuquerque, New Mexico
Amarillo, Texas
Anchorage, Alaska
Boise, Idaho
Butte, Montana
Dallas, Texas (Federal Building)
Denver, Colorado (New Customs House)
Des Moines, Iowa
El Paso, Texas (Fort Bliss)
Fargo, North Dakota
Honolulu, Hawaii
Houston, Texas
Kansas City, Missouri
Las Vegas, Nevada (Remote Processing Station)
Little Rock, Arkansas
Los Angeles, California
Minneapolis, Minnesota (Bishop Henry Whipple Federal Building)
New Orleans, Louisiana
Oklahoma City, Oklahoma (Federal Building)
Omaha, Nebraska
Phoenix, Arizona
Portland, Oregon
Riverside, California (Remote Processing Station)
Sacramento, California
Salt Lake City, Utah
San Antonio, Texas (Fort Sam Houston)
San Diego, California
San Jose, California
Seattle, Washington (Federal Center South)
Shreveport, Louisiana
Sioux Falls, South Dakota
Spokane, Washington 
St. Louis, Missouri (Robert A. Young Federal Building)

External links
USMEPCOM Website
MEPS Map
A Day At The MEPS Video
 DoD Instruction 6130.03, "Medical Standards for Appointment, Enlistment, or Induction in the Military Services," 16 November 2022

Military Entrance Processing Command
Military education and training in the United States